Communist Party of Nepal (Marxist–Leninist) may refer to:

 Communist Party of Nepal (Marxist–Leninist) (1978)
 Communist Party of Nepal (Marxist–Leninist) (1998)
 Communist Party of Nepal (Marxist–Leninist) (2002)